The following is a list of Teen Choice Award winners and nominees for Choice Animated Series. Family Guy receives the most wins with 6.

Winners and nominees

2000s

2010s

See also

 List of animation awards

References

Animated Series
American animation awards